Moscow Heat is a 2004 Russian action film directed by Jeff Celentano.

Cast
 Michael York as Roger Chambers
 Alexander Nevsky (actor) as Vlad Stepanov
 Richard Tyson as Nikolay Klimov
 Robert Madrid as Rudi Souza
 Andrew Divoff as Edward Weston
 Joanna Pacula as Sasha
 Adrian Paul as Andrew Chambers
 Alexander Izotov as Podpolkovnik
 Mariya Golubkina as Masha
 Aleksandr Belyavskiy as Dedushka Vlada
 Sergey Gorobchenko as Oleg
 Gennadi Vengerov as Shishov
 Jeff Celentano as Denis

References

External links
 

2004 films
Russian action drama films
2004 multilingual films
English-language Russian films
Films set in Moscow
2004 action drama films
Russian films about revenge
Russian multilingual films
American multilingual films
2000s English-language films
Films directed by Jeff Celentano